Phi Delta Chi ( or Phi Dex) is a coed. professional fraternity, founded on 2 November 1883 at the University of Michigan in Ann Arbor, Michigan by eleven men, under the sponsorship of Dean Albert B. Prescott.  The fraternity was formed to advance the science of pharmacy and its allied interests, and to foster and promote a fraternal spirit among its brothers, now both male and female.

History

Phi Chi Society
On November 2, 1883, eleven men at the University of Michigan formed the fraternity as the Phi Chi Society. These two Greek letters are reported to have stood for "Pharmacy" and "Chemistry." At that time, there were a number of literary societies at Michigan, but the group's founders believed something should be organized exclusively for the College of Pharmacy. Those Founders were:

 Charles E. Bond
 F. H. Frazee
 Llewellyn H. Gardner
 Charles P. Godfrey
 Arthur G. Hoffman
 A. G. Hopper
 Charles F. Hueber
 G. P. Leamon
 A. S. Rogers
 Azor Thurston
 A. T. Waggoner 

Albert Benjamin Prescott (1832–1905), then Dean of the College of Pharmacy at Michigan, encouraged the Founders in the formation of the society. He was made the first honorary member and served as the group's sponsor.

The night of the second meeting of the Society a motion was made, but failed, to change the name to Phi Delta Chi.

Phi Chi Fraternity
In 1887 the Society, still consisting of a single chapter, was reorganized into a Greek letter fraternity, at which time symbols, signs, a ritual and regalia were adopted.

Expansion followed, with the establishment of fourteen chapters within the first 25 years.

But with expansion, confusion had developed. Unrelated to the thriving Michigan organization devoted to Pharmacy, several years after its establishment as Phi Chi Fraternity, two other similarly-named groups also named Phi Chi sprang up to serve medical students: in 1889 in Vermont, and 1894 in Kentucky. By 1905 these two medical organizations would merge what had become the Northern and Southern branches of that Fraternity, retaining the name "Phi Chi Fraternity". These two were aware of the older pharmacy fraternity, and disagreement had arisen as to which group had the best claim upon that name. Both were thriving, with national ambitions, in a situation made more confusing by the fact that they were both classified as professional fraternities.

Phi Delta Chi Fraternity
In March 1909 Phi Chi Fraternity (Pharmacy) once again considered the matter of the name change, and at that meeting adopted the name Phi Delta Chi for the organization, an action that was ratified at its March 1910 meeting. 

Phi Delta Chi originally accepted only men in the fields of pharmacy and chemistry, the latter including both chemistry majors and chemical engineers. During the depression days of 1928–1933, however, difficulties arose because the fraternity was serving two professions. As a result, membership requirements were changed by 1950 to include pharmacy only. It has been a matter of considerable pride to Phi Delta Chi brothers that the organization not only be kept intact through wars and economic crises, but that brothers also come forward to carry on the work of the organization and to expand it.

In further support of the profession of Pharmacy, in 1922 Phi Delta Chi was instrumental in the foundation of the Rho Chi International Honor Society for Pharmacy, also formed at Michigan. Phi Delta Chi brothers were Rho Chi's first president, vice-president and treasurer.

In 1949, the Fraternity held an unusual mail-in ballot to consider and adopt a change to the Constitution to prohibit discrimination on the basis of race or religion.  This action came shortly after WWII, when all fraternities were adjusting to the massive, and more diverse influx of new college-bound recipients of the G.I. Bill.

The slogan, "Leaders in Pharmacy" was adopted in 1956.

In 1965, brothers from the Fraternity's Chi chapter helped establish Phi Lambda Sigma, a new national Pharmacy Leadership society, which like Rho Chi is an honor society within the field.

The Fraternity became co-educational in 1976 as a result of Title IX.

Centennial celebrations in 1983 culminated with the dedication of a plaque at the University of Michigan School of Pharmacy, commemorating Phi Delta Chi's first 100 years of accomplishments. Today, the Alpha chapter hosts brothers from every chapter for an annual reunion on November 2, to celebrate the founding of Phi Delta Chi in 1883. Expansion has continued in recent decades with many new chapters keeping pace with establishment of new schools of pharmacy in the 1990s and 2000s.

Phi Delta Chi hosts an annual leadership development seminar for its members.
Since its founding Phi Delta Chi has chartered more than 70 collegiate chapters and has welcomed more than 50,000 men and women.

Publications and symbols 
The official publication of the Fraternity is The Communicator, first published nationally in 1906. It has been published regularly since that year. During WWII it was reduced in size and published as The Communicator Junior. Today, The Communicator is published four times annually. Its first editor was Eli Lilly, during 1906-07.

The original badge is a plain gold triangle with a point at the bottom, displaying the letters . The flower is the red carnation.  The Fraternity's colors are Old Gold and Dregs of Wine.

Notable members of Phi Delta Chi 
 Eli Lilly
 Hubert H. Humphrey
 Ralph Saroyan

Collegiate chapters 
The first fourteen chapters used the name Phi Chi Fraternity for the period between 1887 and 1909.
Alpha: University of Michigan
Beta: Northwestern University
Gamma: Columbia University
Delta: University of Wisconsin
Epsilon: Philadelphia College of Pharmacy
Zeta: University of California at San Francisco
Eta: MCPHS University
Theta: University of Minnesota
Iota: University of Maryland
Kappa: University of Washington
Lambda: University of Texas
Mu: University of Pittsburgh
Nu: University of Iowa
Xi: Ohio State University
By the time Omicron chapter was established, the Fraternity had adopted the name Phi Delta Chi.
Omicron: University of Southern California
Pi: University of Nebraska
Rho: University of Oklahoma
Sigma: University of Colorado
Tau: Purdue University
Upsilon: University of Kansas
Phi: Creighton University
Chi: Auburn University
Psi: Drake University
Omega: University of Tennessee
Alpha Alpha: Western Reserve University
Alpha Beta: University of Kentucky
Alpha Gamma: University of North Carolina
Alpha Delta: Medical College of Virginia
Alpha Epsilon: University of Mississippi
Alpha Zeta: Idaho State University
Alpha Eta: Wayne State University
Alpha Theta: Albany College of Pharmacy and Health Sciences
Alpha Iota: University of Georgia
Alpha Kappa: Medical University of South Carolina
Alpha Lambda: University of Connecticut
Alpha Mu: University of Wyoming
Alpha Nu: University of Arizona
Alpha Xi: Ferris State University
Alpha Omicron: Temple University
Alpha Pi: University of Utah
Alpha Rho: Mercer University
Alpha Sigma: University of Illinois-Chicago
Alpha Tau: University of Houston
Alpha Upsilon: Ohio Northern University
Alpha Phi: Butler University
Alpha Chi: Samford University
Alpha Psi: University of the Pacific (United States)
Alpha Omega: Southwestern Oklahoma State University
Beta Alpha: Saint John's University
Beta Beta: University of Louisiana at Monroe
Beta Gamma: Duquesne University
Beta Delta: St. Louis College of Pharmacy
Beta Epsilon: University of Missouri
Beta Zeta: Arnold and Marie Schwartz College of Pharmacy
Beta Eta: University of Arkansas
Beta Theta: University of South Carolina
Beta Iota: Oregon State University
Beta Kappa: Campbell University College of Pharmacy and Health Sciences
Beta Lambda: Nova Southeastern University
Beta Mu: Howard University
Beta Nu: Rutgers University
Beta Xi: Midwestern University
Beta Omicron: Texas Southern University
Beta Pi: Shenandoah University
Beta Rho: Texas Tech University
Beta Sigma: Midwestern University - Glendale
Beta Tau: State University of New York at Buffalo
Beta Upsilon: Roseman University of Health Sciences College of Pharmacy (Henderson)
Beta Phi: Palm Beach Atlantic University
Beta Chi: Northeastern University
Beta Psi: University of Minnesota at Duluth
Beta Omega: Wingate University
Gamma Alpha: University of New Mexico
Gamma Beta: Pacific University
Gamma Gamma: Appalachian College of Pharmacy
Gamma Delta: East Tennessee State University 
Gamma Epsilon: Texas A&M Health Science Center
Gamma Zeta: St. John Fisher College, Wegman's School of Pharmacy
Gamma Eta: Texas Tech University Health Sciences Center -School of Pharmacy
Gamma Theta: University of Hawaii at Hilo, Daniel K. Inouye College of Pharmacy
Gamma Iota: California Northstate University College of Pharmacy
Gamma Kappa: Chicago State University
Gamma Lambda: University of South Alabama (in conjunction with Harrison School of Pharmacy at Auburn University)
Gamma Mu: Husson University
Gamma Nu: University of the Incarnate Word
Gamma Xi: Belmont University
Gamma Omicron: University of Maryland Eastern Shore
Gamma Pi: D'Youville College School of Pharmacy
Gamma Rho: Regis University School of Pharmacy
Gamma Sigma: Rosalind Franklin University of Medicine and Science
Gamma Tau: Western New England University College of Pharmacy and Health Sciences
Gamma Upsilon: Lake Erie College of Osteopathic Medicine - Bradenton
Gamma Phi: University of Findlay
Gamma Chi: University of Charleston School of Pharmacy
Gamma Psi: Washington State University Spokane
Gamma Omega: Lipscomb University College of Pharmacy
Delta Alpha: Marshall University School of Pharmacy
Delta Beta: University of North Texas College of Pharmacy
Delta Gamma: California Health Sciences University
Delta Delta: University of Florida College of Pharmacy
Delta Epsilon: Chapman University School of Pharmacy
Delta Zeta: Keck Graduate Institute School of Pharmacy
Delta Eta: Roseman University of Health Sciences College of Pharmacy (South Jordan)
Delta Theta: Larkin University College of Pharmacy

Pharmacy Leadership & Education Institute (PLEI) 

Phi Delta Chi’s 60th Grand Council (Memphis, 1995) authorized the fraternity's executive council to establish a not-for-profit foundation to advance the leadership, educational, and other benevolent missions of the fraternity. This charge was fulfilled in the creation of the Pharmacy Leadership & Education Institute, Inc., (PLEI), which held the inaugural meeting of its board of directors during APhA's 143rd Annual Meeting in Nashville, March 1996.

The institute is the Fraternity’s charitable and educational arm, advancing the Fraternal mission of training pharmacy’s future leaders. The Internal Revenue Service (IRS) recognizes the institute as a 501(c) (3) charitable organization. The PLEI coordinates the Prescott Pharmacy Leadership Award, the Leader Development Seminar, and other educational events for Fraternity members and associates within the pharmacy profession. The institute is led by a board of directors of distinguished brothers and colleagues. The Grand President, Grand Past President, and Executive Director serve ex officio on the PLEI board of directors.

See also
 Professional fraternities and sororities
 Rho Chi, co-ed, pharmacy honor society

References

Student organizations established in 1883
1883 establishments in Michigan
Professional pharmaceutical fraternities and sororities in the United States
Professional Fraternity Association